The GOL-Sniper Magnum is a bolt-action sniper rifle designed by the German company Gol-Matic GmbH of Birkenau, Hesse. The rifle is available in tactical as well as sporting and match configurations. GOL-Sniper rifles are based on custom Magnum Mauser actions, manufactured by Prechtl Waffen.

Design
The rifle was designed by professional German gunsmith Gottfried Prechtl, who specializes in custom Mauser rifles. The bolt-action is based on Mauser's M98 Magnum system, which was introduced in the late 19th century on the Mauser Gewehr 98. Each rifle is custom made per requisitions of every customer, whether it is for tactical or sporting purposes, resulting in many options and configurations. A Sto-Con walnut stock forms the body of the rifle which is mounted with a Lothar Walther precision barrel and Mauser bolt. The walnut stock increases the flexibility of the rifle butt and therefore reduces recoil allowing for more precision when shooting.

Users

: Used by several police units.
: Lithuanian Armed Forces.

References

External links
Gottfried Prechtl – Manufacturer website
GOL-Sniper at WorldGuns.ru

7.62×51mm NATO rifles
.338 firearms
Bolt-action rifles
Post–Cold War weapons of Germany
Sniper rifles of Germany